Aulne is an unincorporated community in Marion County, Kansas, United States.  The Aulne name was suggested by officials of the railroad when it was built through Aulne during the 19th century.  It is located southwest of Marion at the intersection of Pawnee Road and 140th Street next to the Union Pacific Railroad.

History

Early history

For many millennia, the Great Plains of North America was inhabited by nomadic Native Americans.  From the 16th century to 18th century, the Kingdom of France claimed ownership of large parts of North America.  In 1762, after the French and Indian War, France secretly ceded New France to Spain, per the Treaty of Fontainebleau.

19th century
In 1802, Spain returned most of the land to France.  In 1803, most of the land for modern day Kansas was acquired by the United States from France as part of the 828,000 square mile Louisiana Purchase for 2.83 cents per acre.

In 1854, the Kansas Territory was organized, then in 1861 Kansas became the 34th U.S. state.  In 1855, Marion County was established within the Kansas Territory, which included the land for modern day Aulne.

In 1872, a railroad contractor, named Col. W. Sherburn, decided the location would be good location for a town and named it after himself, Sherburn, but it was too early and never used.

In 1887, the Chicago, Kansas and Nebraska Railway built a branch line north–south from Herington through Aulne to Caldwell.  It foreclosed in 1891 and was taken over by Chicago, Rock Island and Pacific Railway, which shut down in 1980, and reorganized as Oklahoma, Kansas and Texas Railroad which merged in 1988 with Missouri Pacific Railroad, and finally merged in 1997 with Union Pacific Railroad.  Most locals still refer to this railroad as the "Rock Island".

A post office existed in Aulne from August 19, 1887, to February 28, 1954.

20th century
Aulne was one of the finalist communities considered for Tabor College before it was established in Hillsboro in 1908.

During World War I, the local telephone company decreed that "No German could be spoken over the telephones", because of 
anti-German sentiment towards German-Americans.

Geography
Aulne is located at coordinates 38.2761266, -97.0766933 in the scenic Flint Hills and Great Plains of the state of Kansas.  It is roughly halfway between Marion and Peabody next to the Union Pacific Railroad.

Area attractions
 Aulne United Methodist Church, north-east corner of 140th St and Pawnee Rd.
 1890 Marion County Poor Farm (asylum), 1 mi west, 2.1 mi north.  Large 3-story limestone house, now privately owned house, occasional tours by appointment.  Darren E. Burrows lived here briefly as a child.  Indigent, and somewhat "incompetent" people would live here with adult supervision, work the land, raise their own food, and earn their keep. Unwed pregnant girls could stay there until they delivered their babies, which were put up of adoption.  The asylum was self-sustaining for a number of years, even paying taxes to the county.
 Marion Reservoir, approximately seven miles north of Aulne.

Education
The community is served by Marion–Florence USD 408 public school district.  All students attend schools in Marion.  The high school is a member of T.E.E.N., a shared video teaching network between five area high schools.
 Marion High School, located in Marion.
 Marion Middle School, located in Marion.
 Marion Elementary School, located in Marion.

Media

Print
 Marion County Record, newspaper from Marion.
 Hillsboro Free Press, free newspaper for greater Marion County area.

Infrastructure

Transportation
The Oklahoma Kansas Texas (OKT) line of the Union Pacific Railroad runs through the community, but it no longer has a side-spur at Aulne.

Utilities
 Internet
 Satellite is provided by HughesNet, StarBand, WildBlue.
 TV
 Satellite is provided by DirecTV, Dish Network.
 Terrestrial is provided by regional digital TV stations.
 Electricity
 Community and Rural areas provided by Flint Hills RECA.
 Water
 Community and Rural areas provided by Marion County RWD #4 (map).

Notable people
 Floyd B. Danskin, American politician, Washington State House of Representatives from 1921 to 1933, and Speaker of the House from 1925 to 1927.

References

Further reading

 Centennial Anniversary, United Methodist Church, Aulne, Kansas, 1875-1975.
 125th Anniversary Celebration, United Methodist Church, Aulne, Kansas, 1875-2000.

External links

 Aulne United Methodist Church
Historical
 
 Aulne church celebrates 125th anniversary
 Historic Images of Aulne, Special Photo Collections at Wichita State University Library.
 1905 photo of Aulne Rock Island Depot
 Aulne - Dead towns of Kansas
 Marion County cemetery list, archive of KsGenWeb
 Marion County history bibliography,  Marion County school bibliography, Kansas Historical Society
Maps
 Marion County maps: Current, Historic, KDOT
 Topo Map of Marion / Aulne / Canada area, USGS

Unincorporated communities in Kansas
Unincorporated communities in Marion County, Kansas